Puerto Rico Highway 503 (PR-503), also called Carretera Tibes (Road to Tibes), is a tertiary state road that connects Barrio Consejo, in the southwestern part of the municipality of Utuado, to Barrio Tercero in the city of Ponce, and ending at Museo de la Historia de Ponce, one block east of the center of the city at Plaza Las Delicias.

Route description
The road's northern terminus is at its intersection with Puerto Rico Highway 143 in Utuado's barrio Consejo, about 1/4 mile north of Utuado's borderline with the municipality of Adjuntas.  The road runs in a southerly fashion from its northern terminus at Barrio Consejo, Utuado, through barrio Portugués of the municipality of Adjuntas, and then enters the municipality of Ponce, running through barrios Guaraguao, San Patricio, and Tibes. Starting in 2008, the flow of this road through Barrio Tibes was interrupted by the construction of the Rio Portugués river dam. As a result, there is now a permanent 3-mile stretch of this road that no longer exists. The road picks up again at the southern end of the Rio Portugues river dam, continuing in its southerly run through the rest of barrio Tibes and then through barrios Portugués Rural, and Portugués Urbano of the municipality of Ponce, before reaching barrio Sexto (Cantera) in the city of Ponce.  The road then follows the course of Calle Mayor Cantera street in Ponce until it comes to its southern terminus at Calle Mayor street's intersection with Calle Isabel, (Calle Isabel is signed as PR-1).

Portugués dam
PR-503 used to be a single stretch country road from Ponce to Utuado until the late 2000s when construction of the Portugués Dam changed that. In the mid 2010s a segment of this roadway was obliterated by the construction of the Portugués River reservoir, which now sits between the northern section of the road and the southern segment, disrupting the continuity of the road, but providing two approaches to the Dam and access to it from both the north and the south.

Road renamed
On 12 July 2011, Governor Luis Fortuño signed Law #130-2011 (House Bill 2885) naming this road as the David Medina-Feliciano Highway in honor of the costumbrista painter from Ponce.

Major intersections

See also

 List of highways in Ponce, Puerto Rico
 List of highways numbered 503
 List of streets in Ponce, Puerto Rico

References

External links
 
 Guía de Carreteras Principales, Expresos y Autopistas 

503